Darren Andrew "D.A." Points (born December 1, 1976) is an American professional golfer who currently plays on the PGA Tour.

Early years and amateur career
Born and raised in Pekin, Illinois, Points attended Pekin High School, and the University of Illinois, where he was a third team All-American. Points won the Illinois State Amateur Championship in 1995, 1998, and 1999. He lost to Tiger Woods in the quarterfinals of the U.S. Amateur in 1996. Points turned professional in 1999.

Professional career
Points played on the Buy.com Tour (later Web.com Tour) from 2001 to 2004 and won three events: the 2001 Buy.com Inland Empire Open, the 2004 Northeast Pennsylvania Classic and the 2004 Pete Dye West Virginia Classic. He earned his PGA Tour card by finishing second on the Nationwide Tour money list in 2004. He played on the PGA Tour in 2005 and 2006, but dropped back to the Nationwide Tour for 2007 and 2008. At the Miccosukee Championship in 2008, he holed his second shot from the fairway on the last hole on Sunday with a wedge and ended up winning in a playoff over Matt Bettencourt for his fourth career win. He finished 16th on the money list to earn his PGA Tour card for 2009.

Points had his first successful year on the PGA Tour in 2009. He recorded four top-10 finishes, including a third-place finish at the HP Byron Nelson Championship en route to a 66th-place finish on the money list.

In February 2011, Points won his first PGA Tour title at the AT&T Pebble Beach National Pro-Am. He finished two strokes ahead of American Hunter Mahan, aided by an approach shot on the par-five 14th, which he holed for an eagle. He also won the pro-am portion with amateur partner Bill Murray. The victory helped him finish 37th on the money list, his best career finish to date. Points led the 2012 Wells Fargo Championship by one stroke over Rory McIlroy and Rickie Fowler going into the final hole of the tournament. He bogeyed the hole and they went to a sudden death playoff. Fowler won the playoff on the first extra hole with a birdie.

He won his second title on the PGA Tour in 2013 at the Shell Houston Open, sinking a  putt on the 72nd hole to save par and win by a stroke. Points won again in 2017 at the Puerto Rico Open starting the last round with five straight birdies and shooting a final round 66 to take his third PGA Tour title.

Points has been featured in the top 50 of the Official World Golf Ranking.

Amateur wins
1995 Illinois Amateur
1998 Illinois Amateur, Legends of Indiana Intercollegiate
1999 Illinois Amateur

Professional wins (7)

PGA Tour wins (3)

PGA Tour playoff record (0–1)

Nationwide Tour wins (4)

Nationwide Tour playoff record (3–0)

Results in major championships

CUT = missed the half-way cut
"T" = tied

Summary

Most consecutive cuts made – 3 (2014 Open Championship – 2017 PGA, current)
Longest streak of top-10s – 1

Results in The Players Championship

CUT = missed the halfway cut
"T" indicates a tie for a place

Results in World Golf Championships

"T" = Tied

See also
2004 Nationwide Tour graduates
2005 PGA Tour Qualifying School graduates
2008 Nationwide Tour graduates
2016 Web.com Tour Finals graduates
List of golfers with most Web.com Tour wins

References

External links

American male golfers
Illinois Fighting Illini men's golfers
PGA Tour golfers
Korn Ferry Tour graduates
Golfers from Illinois
Golfers from Florida
People from Pekin, Illinois
People from DeLand, Florida
1976 births
Living people